Notvikens IK is a Swedish football club located in Luleå in Norrbotten County.

Background
Since their foundation Notvikens IK has participated mainly in the middle and lower divisions of the Swedish football league system.  The club currently plays in Division 3 Norra Norrland which is the fifth tier of Swedish football. They play their home matches at Tunavallen in Notviken, Luleå.

Notvikens IK are affiliated to the Norrbottens Fotbollförbund. The club won the Midnattsolscupen (Midnight Sun Cup) in 1987.
The club won the DM in 2009.

Season to season

Attendances

In recent seasons Notvikens IK have had the following average attendances:

Footnotes

External links
 Notvikens IK – Official website

Sport in Luleå
Football clubs in Norrbotten County